Gerald William Wiesner, O.M.I., (born June 25, 1937) is a Canadian prelate of the Roman Catholic Church. He was ordained Bishop of the Diocese of Prince George Feb 22 1993 and retired on Jan 3 2013. Stephen Arthur Jensen succeeded him as the new Bishop of Prince George.

Ordination 
Wiesner was ordained a priest in 1963. He taught at Newman Theological College in Edmonton and was named Provincial Superior of the Oblates of St. Mary's Province in Saskatoon in 1984. He was ordained Bishop of Prince George on Feb 22, 1993 and served as President of the Canadian Conference of Catholic Bishops from 1999 to 2001 and a member of its Permanent Council from 1995 to 2001.

Diocese of Prince George 
Wiesner served as the Bishop of Prince George for 20 years. He initiated opportunities for adult faith development, oversaw the reorganization of the diocese and resolved its debt. On Jan 3, 2013, he retired from his post.

Post-episcopal life 
Although he is now retired, Wiesner remains active in teaching and traveling.

References

External links 

1937 births
Living people
20th-century Roman Catholic bishops in Canada
21st-century Roman Catholic bishops in Canada
Missionary Oblates of Mary Immaculate
Roman Catholic bishops of Prince George